Westmalle Brewery (Brouwerij der Trappisten van Westmalle) is a Trappist brewery in the Westmalle Abbey, Belgium. It produces three beers, designated as Trappist beer by the International Trappist Association. Westmalle Tripel is credited with being the first golden strong pale ale to use the term Tripel.

History 

The Trappist abbey in Westmalle (officially called Abdij Onze-Lieve-Vrouw van het Heilig Hart van Jezus) was founded 6 June 1794, but the community was not elevated to the rank of Trappist abbey until 22 April 1836. Martinus Dom, the first abbot, decided the abbey would brew its own beer, and the first beer was brewed on 1 August 1836 and first imbibed on 10 December 1836. The pioneer brewers were Father Bonaventura Hermans and Albericus Kemps. The first beer was described as light in alcohol and rather sweet. By 1856, the monks had added a second beer: the first strong brown beer. This brown beer is today considered the first dubbel ('double' in Dutch). The current Dubbel is derived from a recipe first brewed in 1926. Local sales began in 1856 and the oldest registered sale was on 1 January 1861. The brewery was enlarged and rebuilt in 1865 based on the example set by the Trappists of Forges (nearby Chimay). Father Ignatius van Ham joined the brewer team. Further commercialisation and sales to traders commenced in 1921. In 1933 a complete new brewery was built and in 1934, the brewery brewed a strong pale ale of 9.5% abv giving it the name Tripel - the first modern use of the name. The brewery was remodeled in 1991. It currently has a bottling capacity of 45,000 bottles per hour, and yearly output of 120,000 hl (in 2004).

The majority of the workers in the brewery are no longer monks, but secular staff brought in from outside. There are 22 monks and 40 outside staff.

Products 

The brewery produces three beers. Westmalle Dubbel is a 7% abv Dubbel. Westmalle Tripel is a 9.5% abv tripel, was first brewed in 1934 and the recipe has not changed since 1956. It is made with pale candy sugar and has a very pale colour produced from a mash of light pilsener malts. Styrian Goldings hops are used along with some German varieties and the classic Saaz pilsener hop. After a long secondary fermentation Westmalle Tripel is bottled with a dose of sugar and yeast. Westmalle Extra is a 5% abv beer with limited availability, i.e. a patersbier. It is the beer drunk by the monks during the working-day. It has been speculated that Westmalle's choice of three types of beers was based on the Holy Trinity.

The abbey also produces milk and cheese.

References

Bibliography 

 Jan B. Van Damme o.c.r., Cistercienzers of Trappisten te Westmalle, Westmalle, 1974
 Jan B. Van Damme o.c.r., Geschiedenis van de Trappistenabdij te Westmalle (1794–1956), Westmalle, 1977
 J. Van Remoortere, Ippa's Abdijengids voor Belgie, Lanno, 1990

External links 
 Trappist Abbey of Westmalle

1836 establishments in Belgium
Belgian brands
Trappist breweries in Belgium
Breweries of Flanders
Companies based in Antwerp Province
Malle